The Alagoas screech owl (Megascops alagoensis) is a species of owl in the family Strigidae. It is found only in the Atlantic Forest north of the São Francisco River of Brazil. The holotype was collected at Engenho Coimbra. It is closely related to black-capped screech owl in both morphology and genetics.

This species was described in 2021, and thus recognized in Avibase taxonomic concepts.

Reference

Megascops
Birds of Brazil
Birds described in 2021